→This is a list of Pontic Greeks (Pontioi ), i.e. Greeks from the region of Pontus, in modern northern Turkey.

Ancient
 Diogenes (412/404 BC – 323 BC), also known as Diogenes the Cynic, was a Greek philosopher and one of the founders of Cynic philosophy
 Diphilus (342–291 BC), of Sinope, a poet of the new Attic comedy and contemporary of Menander
 Mithridates VI Eupator (132–63 BC), the most important king of the Kingdom of Pontus
 Laodice, Mithridates VI's sister and first wife
 Diophantus, son of Asclepiodorus, of Sinope, was a general in the service of Mithridates VI of Pontus
 Cleopatra of Pontus (born 110 BC), the Pontic wife of Tigranes the Great and daughter of Mithridates VI of Pontus
 Arcathius, a prince from the Kingdom of Pontus
 Machares, a Pontian prince and son of King Mithridates VI of Pontus and Queen Laodice
 Pharnaces II of Pontus, a prince, then King of Pontus and the Bosporan until his death
 Athenais Philostorgos II, princess from Kingdom of Pontus, was a Roman Client Queen of Cappadocia
 Stratonice of Pontus, a Greek woman from the Kingdom of Pontus, a mistress and fourth wife of King Mithridates VI of Pontus
 Xiphares, a Pontian Greek prince, son of King Mithridates VI of Pontus and Stratonice of Pontus

Roman
Pythodorida of Pontus (30 BC or 29 BC – 38)
Polemon I of Pontus (1st century BC, died 8 BC)
Polemon II of Pontus (12 BC/11 BC–74)
 Strabo (63/64 BC–24 AD), a Greek historian, geographer and philosopher
 Saint Gregory of Neocaesarea, a Christian bishop of the 3rd century
 Saint Eugenios of Trebizond, martyred under Diocletian (284–305) and a cult devoted to him developed in Trebizond
 Anicetus (1st century), pirate, leader of unsuccessful anti-Roman uprising in Pontus in 69

Byzantine

Rulers of the Trebizond Empire
 Alexios I Komnenos (1056–1118/1048), Byzantine emperor from 1081 to 1118, and the founder of the Komnenian dynasty
 Andronikos I of Trebizond, Emperor of Trebizond from 1222 to 1235
 Ioannis I Megas Komnenos, Emperor of Trebizond from 1235 to 1238
 Manuel I Megas Komnenos, Emperor of Trebizond from 1238 to 1263
 Andronikos II Megas Komnenos, Emperor of Trebizond from 1263 to 1266
 Georgios Megas Komnenos, Emperor of Trebizond from 1266 to 1280
 Ioannis II Megas Komnenos, Emperor of Trebizond from 1280 to 1297
 Theodora Megale Komnene, Empress of Trebizond from 1284 to 1285
 Alexios II of Trebizond (1282 – 1330), Emperor of Trebizond from 1297 to 1330
 David Megas Komnenos (c. 1408 – 1 November 1463) Last Emperor of Trebizond from 1459 to 1461

Clerics
 Ecumenical Patriarch John VIII, patriarch of Constantinople from 1064 to 1075. (also saint)

Scholars
 Gregory Choniades (died 1302), astronomer
 Michael Panaretos (1320–c. 1390), historian, protosebastos and protonotarios in the service of Alexios III Megas Komnenos
 George of Trebizond (1395–1472 or 1473), a philosopher and scholar, one of the pioneers of the Renaissance
 George Amiroutzes (1400–1470), a Renaissance scholar and philosopher, a servant of Sultan Mehmed II
 Basilios Bessarion (1403–1472), a Catholic Cardinal Bishop and the titular Latin Patriarch of Constantinople, one of Greek scholars who contributed to the great revival of letters in the 15th century

Early Modern
 Sevastos Kyminitis (1630–1703), scholar who founded the Phrontisterion of Trapezous
 Constantine Mourouzis (died 1783), was a Phanariote Prince of Moldavia, and member of the Mourousis family
 Alexander Ypsilantis (1792–1828), leader of the Filiki Eteria, Greek military commander and national hero
 Demetrios Ypsilantis (1793–1832), second son of Constantine Ypsilantis, one of the early leaders of the Greek Revolution, general under John Capodistria
 Euklidis Kourtidis (1885–1937), Greek revolutionary leader of Pontos (a.k.a. Kapetan Euklidis)
 Nikos Kapetanidis (1889-1922), journalist and activist executed during the Amasya trials
 Anastasios Papadopoulos (1896-1922), Greek revolutionary leader of Pontos (a.k.a. Koja Anastas)
 Venetia Kotta (1897-1945), archaeologist and historian

Contemporary

Actors
 Pamphylia Tanailidi (1891–1937)
 Periklis Hristoforidis (1907–1983)
 Panos Papadopulos (1920-2001)
 Nikos Xanthopoulos (b. 1934)
 Martha Karagianni (b. 1939)
 Vasilis N. Triantafillidis (b. 1940) (a.k.a. Harry Klyn)
 Nikos Sergianopoulos (1952–2008)
 Ieroklis Michailidis (b. 1960)
 Denis Podalydès (b. 1963)
 Fanis Mouratidis (b. 1970)
 Victoria Haralabidou (b. 1971)
 Giorgos Kapoutzidis (b. 1972)
 Alex Dimitriades (b. 1973)
 Mary Akrivopoulou (b. 1975)

Artists
 Joannis Avramidis (b. 1922), sculptor

 Arkhip Kuindzhi (1842–1910), Russian landscape painter
 Sergey Merkurov (1881–1952), prominent Soviet sculptor-monumentalist of Greek-Armenian ancestry
 Nonda (1922-2005), leading Greek artist of the School of Paris

Athletes

Basketball
 Panagiotis Giannakis (b. 1959) (real surname Giannakidis)
 Michalis Romanidis (b. 1966)
 Vasilis Lipiridis (b. 1967)
 Jake Tsakalidis (b. 1979)
 Dimitris Diamantidis (b. 1980)
 Lazaros Papadopoulos (b. 1980)
 Loukas Mavrokefalidis (b. 1984)
 Kostas Vasileiadis (b. 1984)

Football
 Georgios Amanatidis (b. 1970)
 Ioannis Amanatidis (b. 1981)
 Antonis Antoniadis (b. 1945)
 Christos Archontidis (coach also)
 Stefanos Athanasiadis (b. 1988)
 Elias Atmatsidis (b. 1969)
 Giorgios Georgiadis (b. 1987)
 Aristidis Kamaras (b. 1939) (mother)
 Kiriakos Karataidis (b. 1965)
 Yevhen Khacheridi (b. 1987) Ukrainian-Greek footballer for Dynamo Kyiv
 Savvas Kofidis (b. 1961) (coach also)
 Stan Lazaridis (b. 1972) former football player who represented his homeland Australia
 Yuri Lodygin (b. 1990) Russian-Greek goalkeeper for Zenit Saint Petersburg
 Takis Loukanidis (b. 1937)
 Dimitris Mavrogenidis (b. 1976)
 Kostas Nestoridis (b. 1930)
 Demis Nikolaidis (b. 1973)
 Antonios Nikopolidis (b. 1971)
 Andreas Niniadis (b. 1971) (assistant coach also)
 Dimitrios Papadopoulos (b. 1981)
 Mimis Papaioannou (b. 1942)
 Evstaphiy Pechlevanidis (b. 1960)
 Ilias Poursanidis (b. 1972)
 Ilias Rossidis (b. 1928)
 Dimitris Salpingidis (b. 1981)
 Giourkas Seitaridis (b. 1981)
 Ieroklis Stoltidis (b. 1975)
 Efstathios Tavlaridis (b. 1980)
 Ioannis Topalidis (b. 1962) (coach also)
 Vasilis Torosidis (b. 1985)
 Panagiotis Tsalouchidis (b. 1963)
 Zisis Vryzas (b. 1973) (mother)

Martial Arts
 Charalambos Cholidis (b. 1956), former wrestler
 Anton Christoforidis (b. 1918), former NBA world light heavyweight champion
 Michael Katsidis (b. 1980), Australian professional boxer, former WBO interim lightweight champion
 Stan Longinidis (b. 1965), retired professional Australian Heavyweight kickboxer and 8 time Kickboxing World Champion
 Andreas Michailidis, (b. 1988), Greek mixed martial artist
 Elisavet Mystakidou (b. 1977), taekwondo practitioner and Olympic medalist
 Alexandros Nikolaidis (1979-2022), taekwondo athlete and Olympic medalist
 Panagiotis Poikilidis (b. 1965), wrestler
 Mike Zambidis (b. 1980), professional kickboxer, a 13 time World Champion, and current W.K.B.F. super-welterweight kickboxing world champion

Track & Field
 Hrysopiyi Devetzi (b. 1975), triple jump and long jump (mother)
 Anastasia Kelesidou (b. 1972), discus thrower
 Voula Patoulidou (b. 1965), competed in the 100 metres, 100 metres hurdles and in the long jump events
 Ekaterini Stefanidi (b. 1990), pole vaulter
 Georgios Theodoridis (b. 1972), sprinter specializing in the 60 metres and 100 metres
 Athanasia Tsoumeleka (b. 1982) (mother), race walker

Water Sports
 Andreas Kilingaridis (1976–2013), sprint canoer
 Aikaterini Nikolaidou (b. 1992), rower
 Nikolaos Siranidis (b. 1976), diver

Weightlifting
 Ilya Ilyin (b. 1988) (Pontian maternal grandfather, Iakovos Fountoukidis)
 Valerios Leonidis (b. 1966)
 Kakhi Kakhiashvili (b. 1969) (grandmother)

Various Sports
 Eleni Daniilidou (b. 1982), tennis player
 Ioannis Melissanidis (b. 1977), artistic gymnast
 Ioannis Tamouridis (b. 1980), cyclist
Elena Vesnina (b. 1986), tennis player (Greek Pontian grandfather)

Business
 Konstantinos Theofylaktos, was a banker and mayor of Trabzon from 1916 to 1918
 Filaret Galchev (b. 1963), Russian businessman, chairman of Eurocement group (real name Filaretos Kaltsidis)
 Mike Lazaridis (b. 1961), founder and co-CEO of Research In Motion (RIM), which created and manufactures the BlackBerry wireless handheld device
 Dimitris Melissanidis (b. 1946), founder of Aegean Marine Petroleum, president of AEK Athens F.C. from 1992 to 1995
 Ivan Savvidi (b. 1959), Deputy to the State Duma of the Russian Federation, Chairman of PAOK FC and FC SKA Rostov-on-Don, Businessman and president of the Federation of Greek Communities of Russia

Journalists
 Vicky Hadjivassiliou (mother)
 Nikos Kapetanidis Pontic Greek journalist and newspaper publisher
 Mary Kostakidis (b. 1954), former weeknight SBS World News Australia presenter
 Alexandra Pascalidou (b. 1970), journalist, television hostess and author
 Pantelis Savvidis (b. 1954)
 Tatiana Stefanidou (b. 1970)
 Makis Triantafyllopoulos (grandmother)
 Popi Tsapanidou
 George Valavanis

Military
 Achilles Sakis (Tsakeredes), United States Air Force - Retired, Flight test engineer & U.S. Air Force Test Pilot School graduate and instructor, later with Google X Project Wing
 James G. Stavridis, Retired United States Navy admiral & 12th Dean of the Fletcher School of Law and Diplomacy at Tufts University
 Vladimir Triandafillov (1894–1931), Soviet military commander and theoretician (real surname Triantafyllidis)

Models
 Olympia Hopsonidou, Miss Star Hellas 2006

Music
 Aristotelis Koundouroff (1896–1969), composer of the Modern Era
 Iovan Tsaous (1893–1942), musician, and composer of rebetiko songs (real name Yiannis Eitziridis or Etseiridis)
 Odysseas Dimitriadis (1908–2005), classical music conductor
 Stelios Kazantzidis (1931–2001), Greek singer of Greek popular music, or Laïkó, he collaborated with many of Greece's composers (father)
 Chrysanthos (1934–2005), singer and songwriter (his surname is Theodoridis)
 Marinella (b. 1938) one of the most popular Greek singers whose career has spanned several decades (her surname is Papadopoulou)
 Pavlos Sidiropoulos (1948–1990), rock singer, guitarist, songwriter and the "father" of the Greek Rock (father)
 Diamanda Galas (b. 1955), US avant-garde composer, vocalist, pianist, performance artist and painter (Pontian ancestry on her father's side)
 Lefteris Hapsiadis (b. 1953) lyricist, poet and writer of novels
 Vasilis Karras (b. 1953), Greek folk singer (real surname Kesoglidis)
 Kelly Kelekidou Greek singer
 Lefteris Pantazis (b. 1955), Greek folk singer (real surname Pagozidis)
 Pantelis Pantelidis (1983-2016), Greek singer, Youtuber, songwriter and lyricist
 Lefteris Papadopoulos, lyricist, poet and journalist
 Antonis Remos (b. 1970), Greek laïko singer (real surname Paschalidis)
 Natassa Theodoridou (b. 1970), Greek singer
 Matthaios Tsahouridis (b. 1978), plays a range of stringed musical instruments including pontic kemenche, Ph.D. in musicology
 Tania Tsanaklidou (b. 1952), artist, singer, and actress
 Despina Vandi (b. 1969), Greek singer
 Birol Topaloğlu (b. 1965), Pontic songwriter and singer
 Paola Foka, Greek singer (partial)

Politics
 Adonis Georgiadis (b. 1972), Greek politician, historian, publisher, and author
 Leonidas Iasonidis (1884–1959), political activist, congressman of Greek parliament and minister
 Ioannis Passalidis (1886–1968), a prominent member of the Greek Left and founder of the United Democratic Left party
 Dimitrios Partsalidis (1903/1905–1980), communist politician
 Nikos Papadopoulos (b. 1939) Greek-born Swedish Social Democrat politician
 Gavriil Kharitonovich Popov (b. 1936), former mayor of Moscow (real name Gavriil Papadopoulos)
 Savvas Tsitouridis (b. 1954), politician and member of the New Democracy and former Minister for Employment and Social Protection
 Markos Vafiadis (1906–1992), leading cadre of the Communist Party of Greece (KKE) during the Greek Civil War

Science/academia
 George Gurdjieff (1866? – 1949), a mystic and spiritual teacher (real name Georgios Georgiades)
 Viktor Sarianidi (b. 1929), well-known Soviet archaeologist
 Fyodor Yurchikhin (b. 1959), cosmonaut and spacecraft's mechanical engineer (mother)
 John Ioannidis (b. 1965), American scientist, professor, and author

Writers
 Aris Alexandrou (1922–1978), a novelist, poet and translator (father)
 Christos Chomenidis (b. 1966)
 Thea Halo (b. 1941) (mother), author of Not Even My Name, a memoir of her mother's experiences during the Greek genocide
 Sano Halo (1909-2014), survivor of the Greek genocide and nicknamed Grandmother of the Pontic Greeks
 Theodor Kallifatides (b. 1938) (father)
 Dimitris Psathas (1907–1979), journalist and satirical writer (mother)
 Nikolay Sherbina (b. 1821), Russian poet of 19th century (maternal grandparent)
Stephanos Papadopoulos (b.1976) Greek American Poet (father)
 Nikos Grigoriadis (1931-2012), poet and educator.

Various
 A. I. Bezzerides (1908–2007), Greek-Armenian novelist and screenwriter, best known for writing Noir and Action motion pictures, especially several of Warners' "social conscience" films of the 1940s (father)
 Anastasios Papadopoulos (1896–1922), guerilla fighter and leading figure of Pontus
 Yanis Kanidis (1930–2004), Greek-Russian physical education teacher & hero who died to save the lives of his students during the Beslan school hostage crisis
 Filon Ktenidis (1889–1963), playwright, accountant, journalist, doctor and the founder of Panagia Soumela in Kastania, Vermiou in Greece

References

 
Lists of people by ethnicity